Rosemaree Rixon (born 15 April 1967) is a Maltese international lawn bowler.

Biography
She was born in Darlinghurst, New South Wales, Australia and was selected as part of the Maltese team for the 2018 Commonwealth Games on the Gold Coast in Queensland. where she claimed a bronze medal in the Fours with Connie-Leigh Rixon (her daughter), Rebecca Rixon (her daughter) and Sharon Callus.

In 2022, Rixon competed in the Women's fours event at the 2022 Commonwealth Games in Birmingham.

References

1967 births
Living people
Bowls players at the 2018 Commonwealth Games
Bowls players at the 2022 Commonwealth Games
Commonwealth Games bronze medallists for Malta
Commonwealth Games medallists in lawn bowls
Maltese bowls players
Medallists at the 2018 Commonwealth Games